Latigo may refer to:

 Latigo leather, a heavy, durable, and supple cattle hide leather that is combination tanned
 Latigo, a strap used on a Western saddle to connect the cinches to the rigging
 Fisker Latigo CS, an automobile
 Latigo (comic strip) by Stan Lynde
 Látigo (wrestler) (1990–)